Akhmatova Orphans was a group of four twentieth-century Russian poets — Joseph Brodsky, Yevgeny Rein, Anatoly Naiman, and Dmitri Bobyshev — who gathered as acolytes around the poet Anna Akhmatova.  Akhmatova called them her "magic choir", but after Akhmatova's death they were called "Akhmatova's Orphans".

See also
 List of Russian poets

References

Russian literary movements
Russian poetry
Anna Akhmatova